Happy Birthday to Me may refer to:

Film and television 
 Happy Birthday to Me (film), a 1981 Canadian slasher film
 Happy Birthday to Me, a 1998 short film starring Brendan Coyle
 "Happy Birthday to Me" (Scream), a television episode

Music 
 Happy Birthday to Me (album), a 1997 album by The Muffs
 "Happy Birthday to Me" (Hank Locklin song), 1961
 "Happy Birthday to Me", a song by Bulldog Mansion from Funk
 "Happy Birthday to Me", a song by Cracker from Cracker
 "Happy Birthday to Me", a song by Dana Valery
 "Happy Birthday to Me", a song by Epik High from [e]
 "Happy Birthday to Me", a song by Kokia from Remember Me
 "Happy Birthday to Me", a song by Reinhard Mey from Keine ruhige Minute
 "Happy Birthday to Me", a song by Rose Melberg from Portola
 "Happy Birthday to Me", a song by The Vandals from Live Fast, Diarrhea
 "Happy Birthday to Me", a song from the touring stage show Barney's Big Surprise
 "Happy Birthday to Me (Feb. 15)", a song by Bright Eyes, a B-side of the single "Drunk Kid Catholic"

Literature 
 "Happy Birthday to Me", a short story by Alison Venugoban published in the 2001 anthology Nor of Human
 "Happy Birthday to Me", a chapter of the manga Hayate the Combat Butler

See also 
 Happy Happy Birthday To Me Records, an American record label